"Ride" is a song by American singer-songwriter Lana Del Rey from her third extended play (EP), Paradise (2012). The song was written by Lana Del Rey and Justin Parker, while produced by Rick Rubin, the song served as the reissue's first single on September 25, 2012 through Interscope Records. "Ride" is a ballad that thematically involves parental problems, alcohol consumption, and loneliness. The cover for the song depicts Del Rey on a tire swing, wearing cowboy boots and a denim jacket.

"Ride" received critical acclaim from music critics, who compared Del Rey's vocals with that of Adele and Brandon Flowers of The Killers. While only a modest hit in the United States, Switzerland, Ireland, and France, the song reached the top 10 in Russia. The accompanying music video for "Ride" was directed by Anthony Mandler, and was released on October 12, 2012. Del Rey's role in the video was compared to Lolita and A Streetcar Named Desire. The monologue treatment at the start and end of the video met polarized opinion; some considered it "meaningless" and a "gibe to her critics", while others called it "moving" and "really something".

Composition

"Ride" is a ballad. In the song, Del Rey sings over a string-drenched, piano-driven melody produced by Rick Rubin. Lyrically, the song was written by Del Rey and Justin Parker, who co-wrote almost every song on Del Rey's debut album, Born to Die. In the song, Del Rey sings lines such as, "I'm tired of feeling like I'm fucking crazy" and "Been trying' hard not to get into trouble/But I, I've got a war in my mind... so I just ride". The song opens with an audible inhalation, before Del Rey gushes out, "I've been out on that open road". The recording features mild cursing, but is otherwise laced with nostalgic lyrics and husky vocals. To further promote the single and album, an EP was released containing remixes of "Ride". Contributing artists include Sohn, MJ Cole, Eli Escobar, 14th, Wes James, and James Lavelle.

Critical reception

"Ride" earned critical commendation from music critics. Contactmusic.com noticed the track adheres to Del Rey's trademark sound, stating that the notion of her even having a trademark after one commercially successful album indicates that "we haven't seen the last of her just yet." Of the production itself, it was said that "Ride" is more accomplished than Del Rey's previous endeavors, with the strengths of the track outshining the flaws. The reviewer concluded by saying, "All that doe-eyed “you can be my full-time daddy / baby” shtick is going to start getting a little tired pretty soon, though, we reckon."

NME blogged that the song's most significant lyric read, "I'm tired of feeling like I'm fucking crazy", while stating that the accompanying music video may be produced solely by Del Rey, as the videos for "Carmen" and "Video Games" were. In a separate review for the same publication, Eve Barlow was critical of the song, writing that Del Rey sounded like "an oversexed frog being dragged against a washboard." Pitchfork Media opined aforementioned lyric was a rare moment of raw emotion by Del Rey. Billboard wrote: "Ride' is a long, dreamy ballad that swells into full view during the chorus, when the singer declares, 'Been trying' hard not to get into trouble/But I, I've got a war in my mind… so I just ride." MTV called "Ride" a "slow burn" and "as mellow and languorous...as on her debut." Another MTV review said: "On 'Ride,' Rey sings what she knows best: loneliness, some daddy issues and day-drinking. All of this is probably a metaphor for something, but honestly, we’re still trying to figure out what those 'Born To Die' tigers mean." A third review by MTV dubbed the single the number one "Must Hear" song of the week, saying, "Heaven is truly a place on Earth with you, Miss Lana." Similarities were drawn between "Ride" and work by The Killers frontman, Brandon Flowers, on his solo debut, Flamingo. Stuff said the title "Ride" was predictably pokerfaced. Cameron Matthew of Spinner noted that Del Rey "amped up on the smokey vocals" with "Ride."

Tom Breihan of Stereogum said "Ride": "moves [Del Rey] back to the power of "Video Games" and "Blue Jeans" while simultaneously pushing her into a grand Adele crossover-soul-pop zone. It's really nice. There's hope for this lady yet!" Amanda Dobbins wrote on New York magazine's professional music blog, Vulture, that Del Rey is "still calling men who are not her father 'Daddy," on "Ride." Dose reviewer Leah Collins called the record "predictably morose". Complex named "Ride" the eighth best song of 2012.

Music video

Cover versions
Nashville songwriter and producer Shane Tutmarc released cover of "Ride" as a single in January 2013. Tutmarc's music video features home videos of JFK, Elvis Presley and Marilyn Monroe.

British indie rock band White Lies released cover of "Ride" on their 2013 EP Small TV.

Track listing

Credits and personnel
Credits for Paradise adapted from Barnes & Noble.
Performance
Lana Del Rey – primary artist, vocals, backing vocals, composer, writer

Technical
Justin Parker – composer
Rick Rubin – producer
Andrew Scheps – mixer.

Charts

Certifications

Release history

References

External links

2012 singles
American country music songs
American soul songs
Country ballads
Lana Del Rey songs
Interscope Records singles
Pop ballads
Song recordings produced by Rick Rubin
Music videos directed by Anthony Mandler
Songs written by Justin Parker
Songs written by Lana Del Rey
2010s ballads
2012 songs
Soul ballads